Gavinelli is an Italian surname. Notable people with the surname include:

Bagio Gavinelli (1898–1981), Italian racing cyclist
Rodolfo Gavinelli (1891/1895–1921), Italian footballer 

Italian-language surnames